is a railway station in Setagaya, Tokyo, Japan, operated by the private railway operator Tokyu Corporation. It is located at the merging of two highways, National Route 246 and Setagaya-dori, just outside the central area of Shibuya. The station is the terminus of the Setagaya Line and is also served by the Den-en-toshi Line.

Lines
Sangen-Jaya Station is served by the Tokyu Den-en-toshi Line, and also forms the terminus of the Tokyu Setagaya Line.

Layout

Den-en-toshi Line

Two sub-surface side platforms serving two tracks:

Setagaya Line
Two bay platforms serving a single track:

History
On , Sangen-Jaya initially opened as a station on the Tamagawa line.

Surrounding area
  National Route 246
 Carrot Tower

In Popular Culture 
The area is the basis for a district called Yongen-Jaya in the video game Persona 5 and its spin-offs, just outside of Shibuya. The town was modeled after Sangen-Jaya, and shares part of the same name.

See also

 List of railway stations in Japan

References

External links

 Den-en-toshi Line station 
 Setagaya Line station 

Railway stations in Japan opened in 1907
Tokyu Den-en-toshi Line
Tokyu Setagaya Line
Stations of Tokyu Corporation
Railway stations in Tokyo